Christine Marzano (born September 5, 1986) is the CEO and founder of an LA-based, fashion, tech company BODS. She is a former model and actress.

Early life and education
Marzano was born in Brooklyn, New York to an Italian father and an Irish mother. She received a bachelor's degree in psychology and neuroscience from Princeton University, and later studied Shakespeare at the British American Drama Academy in London.

Career

Modeling
She walked the International runways for Christian Dior, YSL, Gucci, Fendi, Balmain, John Galliano, Thierry Mugler, Giorgio Armani, MaxMara, Peter Som, Dries Van Noten, and many more.

Acting
While modeling, Marzano began serious acting training, and appeared in numerous television commercials. After graduating from Princeton, she decided to pursue acting full-time.

Marzano appeared as a bilingual prostitute in  Seven Psychopaths  (2012), winning as part of Best Ensemble Cast at the 2012 Boston Society of Film Critics Awards, and nominated in the same category at the 2012 San Diego Film Critics Society Awards. She also had a supporting role as a brothel madam in the 2013 vampire film Byzantium and appeared in the 2013 thriller Paranoia. She portrayed celebrity florist and landscape designer Charlotte Heavey in the 2015 film Dare to Be Wild and appeared in the 2016 Harry Potter prequel Fantastic Beasts and Where to Find Them, written by JK Rowling and directed by David Yates.

She has appeared in the  2018 American action film Death Race: Beyond Anarchy alongside Zach McGowan and Frederick Koehler, the fourth film in the Death Race series.

Personal life
Marzano has dual Irish-US citizenship, and lives in Los Angeles, California.

Filmography

Film

Television

References

External links
 

Living people
1986 births
People from Brooklyn
Princeton University alumni
Alumni of the British American Drama Academy
American people of Italian descent
American people of Irish descent
American female models
American film actresses
Actresses from New York City
Actresses from Los Angeles
21st-century American women